Club Football Estrela da Amadora, sometimes just Estrela, is a Portuguese sports club (predominantly football) based in Amadora, northwest of Lisbon.

It's the successor of Clube de Futebol Estrela da Amadora, founded in 1932 and extinct in 2011 due to financial problems and bankruptcy.

The club was newly founded in 2020, when Clube Desportivo Estrela merged with Club Sintra Football and taking the place of that team in the third-tier Campeonato de Portugal. C.F. Estrela da Amadora plays at Estádio José Gomes.

History
The current club was founded in the summer of 2020, after a merger between Clube Desportivo Estrela and Club Sintra Football. Instead of Clube de Futebol Estrela da Amadora, the club is officially named Club Football Estrela da Amadora and André Geraldes was designated as the President.

The club didn't take the honours of any of its predecessors (Clube de Futebol Estrela da Amadora, Clube Desportivo Estrela and Club Sintra Football), being effectively a new club.

After Clube de Futebol Estrela da Amadora closed its doors in 2011, a group of supporters founded Clube Desportivo Estrela, keeping the legacy, youth teams and other sports of the original club.

In 2018, CD Estrela created a senior football team, playing in the Lisbon Football Association regional championships. But in 2020, the club's members voted 92% in favour in July 2020 of a merger with Club Sintra Football, taking that team's place in the third-tier Campeonato de Portugal. A Sociedade Anónima Desportiva was formed, branded as Club Football Estrela da Amadora and with André Geraldes being the President. The original Clube de Futebol Estrela da Amadora emblem was taken. The club's first season ended with promotion, despite losing the play-off final 1–0 to C.D. Trofense.

Players

Current squad

Out on loan

League and Cup history

Kit
Estrela's kit is white with the shirt split with three colours (hence the nickname 'the tricolours'). Left side was red, the middle white and the right green, with the shorts and socks white.

References

 
Football clubs in Portugal
Association football clubs established in 2020
Liga Portugal 2 clubs
2020 establishments in Portugal